Ashley Watson (born 26 March 1984) is an Australian rules footballer who played for North Melbourne between 2003 and 2005.

He was drafted in the 2001 AFL Draft with the 14th selection from Bendigo Pioneers in the TAC Cup.  He played seven games in four seasons at the Kangaroos before he was delisted at the end of the 2005 season.

Ashley now plays for Rochester in the Goulburn Valley Football League, where he won the leagues honour, the Morrison Medal in 2015.

References

External links

Living people
1984 births
Bendigo Pioneers players
North Melbourne Football Club players
Australian rules footballers from Victoria (Australia)